Podlož is a village north of Lož in the Municipality of Loška Dolina in the Inner Carniola region of Slovenia.

Church
The local church is built on Cross Mountain, a hill above the settlement, and is dedicated to the Holy Cross. It belongs to the Parish of Stari Trg. It is a pilgrimage church with a series of 13 chapels representing the Stations of the Cross leading up to the main church. The church was first mentioned in written documents dating to 1526. It was rebuilt in the mid-18th century.

References

External links

Podlož on Geopedia

Populated places in the Municipality of Loška Dolina